Noel Santos Román, known professionally as Noriel, is a Puerto Rican rapper, singer and songwriter, signed to Sony Music Latin. Noriel became known after singing with Maluma on his track "Cuatro Babys" and releasing a popular album called Trap Capos: Season 1.

Discography

Studio albums 
 Trap Capos: Season 1 (2016) (RIAA: 2× Platinum (Latin))
 Trap Capos II (2018) (RIAA: Platinum (Latin))

Singles

As lead artist

As featured artist

References 

Living people
Puerto Rican rappers
Puerto Rican reggaeton musicians
Latin trap musicians
21st-century American rappers
Year of birth missing (living people)